Macho is the surname of:

 Fidel Uriarte Macho (born 1945), Spanish retired footballer
 José Cos y Macho (1838-1919), Spanish Roman Catholic cardinal and archbishop
 Jürgen Macho (born 1977), Austrian footballer
 Michal Macho (born 1982), Slovak ice hockey player
 Palo Macho (born 1965), Slovak painter
 Victorio Macho (1887–1966), Spanish sculptor

See also
 Ferenc Machos (1932-2006), Hungarian footballer